

The Chrysler VZ-6 was an American VTOL ducted-fan test vehicle designed and built by Chrysler for the United States Army Flying Jeep competition.

Design and development
Ordered in 1958, two VZ-6s were built.  It was a rectangular-shaped vehicle with two three-bladed propellers inset at the front and back. The 500 hp Lycoming engine was located in the center driving the ducted fan propellers. It was also fitted with rubber skirts around the bottom edge of the vehicle similar to a hovercraft.

Operational history
The VZ-6 started tethered flight tests in 1959, but these showed that the vehicle was overweight and underpowered with stability problems. An attempt at a non-tethered flight resulted in the VZ-6 flipping over, writing off the vehicle, but the pilot escaped without any serious injuries. Both VZ-6s were scrapped in 1960.

Specifications

See also

References

Notes

1950s United States experimental aircraft
VZ-6
Ducted fan-powered aircraft
Mid-engined aircraft
VTOL aircraft
Aircraft first flown in 1959